The Eisner Award for Best Publication for Teens is an award for "creative achievement" in American comic books.

History and name change

The award was launched in 2008 as Best Publication for Teens. In 2009 the name was changed to Best Publication for Teens/Tweens for one year. In 2012 the name of the award was changed to 2012: Best Publication for Young Adults (Ages 12-17). In 2013 the name of the award was changed to Best Publication for Teens (ages 13-17). In 2020 the name was changed to Best Publication for Teens.

Winners and nominees

References

Category
2008 establishments in the United States
Annual events in the United States
Awards established in 2008
Publication for Teens